Rik de Voest (born 5 June 1980) is a former professional South African tennis player. He achieved his career-high singles ranking of world No. 110 in August 2006. Rik resides in Vancouver, Canada where he pursues a career in real estate.

De Voest qualified for the 2007 Wimbledon Championships where he lost to Marat Safin in the first round. He also qualified for the US Open later on in 2007, where he defeated Thierry Ascione 6–2, 3–0 before Ascione retired. De Voest went on to lose to John Isner in the following round.

Playing with Scott Lipsky in men's doubles, he won the Levene Gouldin & Thompson Tennis Challenger in Binghamton, New York in 2009.

In Davis Cup matches for South Africa, de Voest has a win–loss record of 27–19 (18–16 in singles, 9–3 in doubles).

Performance timelines

Singles

Doubles

ATP career finals

Doubles: 3 (2 titles, 1 runner-up)

ATP Challenger and ITF Futures finals

Singles: 27 (14–13)

Doubles: 79 (47–32)

External links
 
 
 
 De Voest World ranking history

South African male tennis players
Afrikaner people
1980 births
Living people
Italian emigrants to South Africa
Alumni of Pretoria Boys High School
South African emigrants to Canada